× Astrolista (from Astroloba and Tulista) is a nothogenus of naturally occurring inter-generic hybrids in the Little Karoo region of the Western Cape Province, South Africa.

Species
The nothogenus only contains one species × Astrolista bicarinata, which is a commonly occurring and extremely variable natural hybrid between Tulista pumila and Astroloba corrugata that occurs where their natural distribution ranges overlap in the far western corner of the Little Karoo, South Africa.

References

Monotypic Asphodelaceae genera
Flora of Southern Africa
Plant nothogenera
Asphodeloideae